This article details the Bradford Bulls rugby league football club's 2001 season, the 6th season of the Super League era.

Season review

February 2001

The Bulls started their defence of the Challenge Cup with a 54–10 win over Championship side Widnes Vikings, Michael Withers was the key man as he crossed for a hat-trick. Bradford backed up this great start with a dominating performance in the 5th Round of the Challenge Cup as they cruised past Halifax Blue Sox 68–18.

March 2001

Bradford begun their Super League campaign by beating champions St Helens R.F.C. 31–24, new signing Shane Rigon scored a hat-trick which helped the Bulls get off to a winning start. The Bulls continued their Challenge Cup defence with a 38–0 win over Wakefield Trinity Wildcats. Bradford kept their winning streak intact as they hammered Salford City Reds 40–6 and then backed this up with a 30–14 win away at Huddersfield Giants.

April 2001

The Bulls continued their good start to the season with a hard fought 24–6 victory over London Broncos however the next week they were surprised as Wakefield Trinity Wildcats beat Bradford 16–12 to end the Bulls winning streak. Bradford soon got back to winning ways with a great performance by beating Wigan Warriors 35–24, this victory was short lived however as the Bulls drew 24–24 to Hull FC. The Bulls were not able to defend their Challenge Cup title as they fell 13–6 to St Helens R.F.C. in a match which was played under terrible weather as rain swept Twickenham Stadium.

May 2001

Bradford put the Challenge Cup defeat behind them as they hammered Warrington Wolves 56–24 at Valley Parade. They backed this up with a hard fought 24–22 win against Castleford Tigers. Bradford continued their winning streak with an outstanding 33–14 win over arch rivals Leeds Rhinos at Headingley Stadium. The Bulls demolished Halifax Blue Sox at home with an emphatic 64–12 win, Leon Pryce was the star of the match scoring a hat-trick whilst Henry Paul kicked 10 goals. Bradford finished May with a 42–10 victory over Salford City Reds.

June 2001

Bradford started June with a 38–26 loss at the hands of St Helens R.F.C. They soon bounced back though with an outstanding 78–18 win against Huddersfield Giants. The Bulls backed up this fine form with a 42–0 win against London Broncos and then recorded another big win as they beat Wakefield Trinity Wildcats 62–10. Bradford finished the month with a 44–30 loss to a fired up Wigan Warriors side.

July 2001

The Bulls started July with a bang as the outclassed Hull F.C. and beat them 40–0. Bradford posted yet another big score as they took apart Castleford Tigers with a 44–4 victory. The Bulls continued their good form as they smashed rivals Leeds Rhinos 44–22 at Valley Parade. Bradford finished July with a 52–28 win against Halifax Blue Sox.

August 2001

The month started with a disappointing 18–14 loss to Warrington Wolves. They soon bounced back and Leeds Rhinos were on the wrong end of a 34–6 scoreline, in this match Henry Paul became the joint top scorer for the Bulls in the Super League era as he registered 860 points (joint with Steve McNamara). Henry Paul took over Steve McNamara as highest point scorer for the Bulls in the Super League as he kicked 8 goals in the impressive 27–14 win against St Helens R.F.C. A Michael Withers hat-trick helped the Bulls to a 56–30 victory over the Castleford Tigers. The Bulls ended the month with an unfortunate 16–10 loss to Wigan Warriors.

September 2001

Bradford started September with a bang as Graham Mackay and Michael Withers both scored a hat-trick as the Bulls beat Warrington Wolves 84–12. Bradford finished the regular season with a 62–18 win over rivals Leeds Rhinos which meant that the Bulls ended the season on top of the table by points difference. At the end of the month Bradford faced Wigan Warriors in the Qualifying Semi-final, the Bulls won 24–18 thanks to the Paul brother dominating with ball and boot. Robbie Paul scored 2 tries while brother Henry Paul kicked 8 goals.

October 2001

Bradford's opponents for the Grand Final were Wigan Warriors. The Bulls asserted their dominance early on as they raced into a 22–0 lead in the first half. Michael Withers scored a hat-trick and Stuart Fielden, James Lowes and Graham Mackay (in his last game) also scored for the Bulls. Henry Paul slotted a drop goal over to ensure that the Bulls became Super League champions for a 2nd time.

2001 milestones

CCR4: Michael Withers scored his 4th hat-trick for the Bulls.
CCR5: Daniel Gartner and Lee Gilmour scored their 1st tries for the Bulls.
CCR5: Robbie Paul scored his 75th try and reached 300 points for the Bulls.
Round 1: Shane Rigon scored his 1st try and 1st hat-trick for the Bulls.
CCQF: Henry Paul scored his 25th try for the Bulls.
Round 3: Leon Pryce scored his 25th try and reached 100 points for the Bulls.
Round 4: Henry Paul reached 600 points for the Bulls.
Round 8: Graham Mackay scored his 1st try for the Bulls.
Round 8: Tevita Vaikona scored his 3rd hat-trick for the Bulls.
Round 9: James Lowes reached 300 points with the Bulls.
Round 11: Leon Pryce scored his 1st hat-trick for the Bulls.
Round 11: Henry Paul reached 700 points with the Bulls.
Round 12: Lee Gilmour scored his 1st hat-trick for the Bulls.
Round 12: Henry Paul kicked his 300th goal for the Bulls.
Round 14: Graham Mackay scored his 1st hat-trick for the Bulls.
Round 14: Joe Vagana scored his 1st try for the Bulls.
Round 16: Tevita Vaikona and Michael Withers scored their 50th tries and reached 200 points for the Bulls.
Round 18: Henry Paul reached 800 points with the Bulls.
Round 19: James Lowes scored his 75th try for the Bulls.
Round 21: Tevita Vaikona scored his 4th hat-trick for the Bulls.
Round 25: Michael Withers scored his 5th hat-trick for the Bulls.
Round 27: Graham Mackay scored his 2nd hat-trick for the Bulls.
Round 27: Michael Withers scored his 6th hat-trick for the Bulls.
Round 27: Henry Paul reached 900 points for the Bulls.
Round 27: Paul Deacon kicked his 100th goal for the Bulls.
Round 28: Henry Paul kicked his 400th goal for the Bulls.
Grand Final: Michael Withers scored his 7th hat-trick for the Bulls.
Grand Final: Graham Mackay kicked his 1st goal for the Bulls.

Table

Notes

2001 fixtures and results

2001 Tetley's Super League

Challenge Cup

Playoffs

2001 squad statistics

 Appearances and Points include (Super League, Challenge Cup and Play-offs) as of 2012.

References

External links
Bradford Bulls Website
Bradford Bulls in T&A
Bradford Bulls on Sky Sports
Bradford on Super League Site
Red,Black And Amber
BBC Sport-Rugby League 

Bradford Bulls seasons
Bradford Bulls